Giulia Lola Stabile (born 20 June 2002 in Rome, Lazio) is an Italian dancer and television presenter of Spanish origin on her mother's side and Italian on her father's side, winner of the twentieth edition of Amici di Maria De Filippi.

Biography 
Giulia Stabile was born on June 20, 2002 in Rome, to a Spanish mother, Susi Castaner and an Italian father, Carlo Stabile. She became passionate about dance at the age of only three.

Career 
Giulia Stabile from 2006 to 2021 attended the Buccellato Rossi Academy, from which she obtained her diploma after finishing it. In 2014 he participated in the program Ti lascio una canzone, conducted by Antonella Clerici.

In 2020 she joined the television program Amici di Maria De Filippi, which she will win on May 15 of the following year, becoming the first female dancer to achieve this result. She later returns to the program as a professional dancer.

On 20 June 2021 he participated in the Domenica in program, broadcast on Rai 1 with the conduct of Mara Venier. In the same year Carla Fracci Mon Amour participated in the event, dedicated to the great dancer after her death, and in the program Una voce per Padre Pio, conducted by Mara Venier. Also in 2021 after her victory at Amici di Maria De Filippi, she was interviewed together with Sangiovanni in the Verissimo program, conducted by Silvia Toffanin.

In 2021 it became part of the Tú sí que vales program. In the same year he hosted the program Fai un gavettone, broadcast on the Witty TV platform. Since 2021 he has been conducting Intervista Stabile for the Witty TV web platform. From 2022 to 2023 he conducted Oreo Challenge for the Witty TV web platform and broadcast on Canale 5 at the end of the day-times of Amici di Maria De Filippi.

In 2022 she was chosen to voice in the animated film The Sea Beast (Il mostro dei mari) directed by Chris Williams and where she voiced the young Lookout of the Inevitable. The film was released on the Netflix streaming platform on July 8, 2022. In the same year she took part in the Giving Back Generation series.

On 17 January 2023 he participated as a competitor in the Millennials team together with Paolo Ciavarro, Ema Stokholma and Pierpaolo Pretelli in the television program Boomerissima, broadcast on Rai 2 with the conduction of Alessia Marcuzzi. On 28 January of the same year she was interviewed again in the Verissimo program, broadcast on Canale 5 with Silvia Toffanin conducting.

Personal life 
Giulia Stabile from December 2020 has been sentimentally linked to the singer Sangiovanni, also a competitor of the 2020-2021 season of Amici di Maria De Filippi.

Filmography

Films

Television

Music video

Video Games

Web TV

Palmarès

References

External links 

 
 Giulia Stabile at WittyTV

 2002 births
Living people
People from Rome
Italian dancers
Italian television presenters
Italian women television presenters
Italian female dancers
Italian twins
Italian people of Spanish descent